The Tuva silver vole (Alticola tuvinicus) is a species of rodent in the family Cricetidae.
It is found in Mongolia and Russian Federation.

References

Alticola
Mammals of Mongolia
Mammals of Russia
Mammals described in 1950
Taxonomy articles created by Polbot